Francis Alexander McMinn (10 November 1874 – 8 August 1947), usually known as Alex or Paddy McMinn was a New Zealand rugby union player. Playing most of his rugby at hooker, McMinn represented Manawatu, Hawke's Bay and Wellington at a provincial level. He was a member of the New Zealand national side, the All Blacks, in 1904, appearing in a single test match against the touring British Isles team. He was the son of Irish journalist Alexander McMinn, who established the Manawatu Evening Standard newspaper in 1880.

References

1874 births
1947 deaths
People from Turakina
New Zealand people of Irish descent
New Zealand rugby union players
New Zealand international rugby union players
Manawatu rugby union players
Hawke's Bay rugby union players
Wellington rugby union players
Rugby union hookers
Rugby union players from Manawatū-Whanganui